Hans Petter Fjeld Skinstad (born 13 June 1946 in Nord-Odal) is a Canadian former cross-country skier who competed in the 1976 Winter Olympics.

References

1946 births
Living people
People from Nord-Odal
Canadian male cross-country skiers
Olympic cross-country skiers of Canada
Cross-country skiers at the 1976 Winter Olympics
Norwegian emigrants to Canada